F.C. al-Nahda Nazareth ( lit.: Football Club Renaissance Nazareth) is an Arab-Israeli football club based in Nazareth. The club currently plays in Liga Bet North A division.

History
The club was founded in 2012 and registered to play in Liga Gimel. In its first season, the club finished 8th in the Jezreel division and was eliminated from the cup in the 3rd round. The club won the division in the following season and won the divisional state cup and advancing to the 6th round of the State Cup. In its first season in Liga Bet, the club finished in 10th place.

Honours

League

Cups

External links
Football Club al-Nahda Nazareth The Israel Football Association 

Arab Israeli culture
Nazareth
Association football clubs established in 2012
2012 establishments in Israel
Sport in Nazareth
Arab-Israeli football clubs